Lebuh SPA (Sungai Udang–Paya Rumput–Ayer Keroh Highway), Federal Route 33 (formerly Malacca State Route M17), is a major highway in Malacca state, Malaysia. This 23.1 km (14.4 mile) highway connects Sungai Udang in the west to Ayer Keroh in the east.

Route background
The Kilometre Zero of the Federal Route 33 starts from Sungai Udang.

History
Construction began in 2002 and was completed in 2005. In 2010, the highway was gazetted as the federal roads by JKR as Federal Route 33.

Features
 This highway features fast lane-to-slow lane U-turns.
 Two-lane carriageway
 Hang Jebat Stadium

At most sections, the SPA Highway was built under the JKR R5 road standard as a dual-carriageway highway with partial access control, with a speed limit of 90 km/h.

There are no overlaps, alternate routes, or sections with motorcycle lanes.

List of interchanges

References

Highways in Malaysia
Malaysian Federal Roads